Alan Bannister (born September 3, 1951) is a retired professional baseball player who played in the major leagues for the Philadelphia Phillies  Chicago White Sox (1976–80), Cleveland Indians  Houston Astros (1984) and Texas Rangers  Originally a shortstop, he was a utility player during his major league career.

Biography
Bannister attended John F. Kennedy High School in La Palma, CA and then played college baseball at Arizona State University. He represented the United States at the 1971 Pan American Games, where he won a silver medal. Highly touted in college, Bannister was the Phillies' first-round pick in the 1973 draft (January). Although versatile (he played every position but pitcher and catcher) he never lived up to his college billing and was rarely a regular. He opened the 1975 season as the Phillies' starting center fielder until the arrival of Garry Maddox from the San Francisco Giants on May 4. He was traded with Dick Ruthven and Roy Thomas to the Chicago White Sox for Jim Kaat and Mike Buskey on December 10, 1975. Only once, as the 1977 White Sox' shortstop (after the trade of Bucky Dent in April), did he play in over 100 games at a position, and then he led all AL shortstops in errors (40). He led the American League in sacrifice flies (11) in 1977.

In 12 major league seasons he played in 972 games and recorded 3,007 at bats, 430 runs, 811 hits, 143 doubles, 28 triples, 19 home runs, 288 RBI, 108 stolen bases, 292 walks, with a .270 batting average, .334 on-base percentage and a .355 slugging percentage.

After his playing career, he managed two years in the Montreal Expos minor league system and three years for the AZL Giants of the Arizona League. He was inducted to the College Baseball Hall of Fame in 2010.

As an amateur, Bannister was involved in a play which resulted in a fatality. In July 1972, he was a participant in a Baseball Federation tour of Japan. While attempting to complete a double play during a game against a Japanese team, he made a throw to first base which struck the head of Akira Tohmon, who was advancing from first base to second base. Tohmon was knocked unconscious, and later died at a hospital as a result of cerebral contusion.

References

External links

Alan Bannister at SABR (Baseball BioProject)
Alan Bannister at Baseball Almanac
Alan Bannister - Baseballbiography.com

1951 births
Living people
Arizona State Sun Devils baseball players
Baseball players at the 1971 Pan American Games
Baseball players from California
Chicago White Sox players
Cleveland Indians players
National College Baseball Hall of Fame inductees
Eugene Emeralds players
Houston Astros players
Iowa Oaks players
Major League Baseball infielders
Major League Baseball outfielders
Minor league baseball managers
Pan American Games silver medalists for the United States
Philadelphia Phillies players
Sportspeople from Montebello, California
St. Petersburg Pelicans players
Texas Rangers players
Toledo Mud Hens players
Pan American Games medalists in baseball
All-American college baseball players
Medalists at the 1971 Pan American Games